And the Devil Will Drag You Under (1979) is a comic fantasy by American writer Jack Chalker involving an alcoholic demon and two humans he summons to collect the pieces of a mystic artifact that the demon requires to save Earth from an asteroid on a collision course. The humans' journeys include both mystical transformations of their bodies and trips to worlds that parodied famous fantasy novel locales.

The book's title is an homage to "Sit Down, You're Rockin' the Boat", a song written by musical theatre composer-lyricist Frank Loesser for Guys and Dolls, in which the character Nicely-Nicely Johnson, making a gospel style confession at a Salvation Army prayer meeting, tells of a dream in which his fellow passengers, on a "little boat to heaven", warn him that if he upsets the ride, he will be washed overboard: "and the Devil will drag you under/By the sharp lapel of your checkered coat...".

Publication history
 1979, USA, Del Rey, publication date August 1979.

1979 American novels
Novels by Jack L. Chalker
American comedy novels
American fantasy novels
Del Rey books
Fiction about the Devil